Navajo Springs Outlier is an Ancestral Puebloan outlier community located  southwest of Chaco Culture National Historical Park, New Mexico. The great house is one of the more westerly Chacoan pueblos. Three small house sites are located nearby, as are several midden piles. The site also contains a great kiva and seven berms. Two ancient roads connect portions of the site, which is protected by the Navajo Nation.

References

Bibliography

Colorado Plateau
Ancestral Puebloans
Post-Archaic period in North America
Archaeological sites in New Mexico
Chaco Canyon
Chaco Culture National Historical Park